Mimoza Ahmeti (born 12 June 1963) from Kruja is an Albanian woman poet.

Works
After two volumes of verse in the late eighties, it was the 53 poems in the collection Delirium, Tirana 1994 (Delirium), which caught the public's attention. Her most recent book is The Pollination of Flowers. Ahmeti has published widely and her books have been translated into Italian, French and English. Although best known for her poems, she has also written short stories and articles. List of her published works include: 

 Ça va Albanie? 
 L'absurde coordinatif 
 Milchkuss Roman  
 Pjalmini i luleve : poezi

References

1963 births
Living people
20th-century Albanian poets
Albanian women writers
Albanian writers
People from Krujë
Albanian women poets
20th-century women writers